Arachidonic acid 5-hydroperoxide (5-hydroperoxyeicosatetraenoic acid, 5-HPETE) is an intermediate in the metabolism of arachidonic acid by the ALOX5 enzyme in humans or Alox5 enzyme in other mammals. The intermediate is then further metabolized to: a) leukotriene A4 which is then metabolized to the chemotactic factor for leukocytes, leukotriene B4, or to contractors of lung airways, leukotriene C4, leukotriene D4, and leukotriene E4; b) the leukocyte chemotactic factors, 5-Hydroxyicosatetraenoic acid and 5-oxo-eicosatetraenoic acid; or c) the specialized pro-resolving mediators of inflammation, lipoxin A4 and lipoxin B4.

References

Organic peroxides
Biochemistry
Eicosanoids
Fatty acids